was a town located in Agawa District, Kōchi Prefecture, Japan.

On August 1, 2005, Ikegawa, along with the village of Agawa (also from Agawa District), and the village of Niyodo (from Takaoka District), was merged to create the town of Niyodogawa (in Agawa District), and no longer exists as an independent municipality.

External links
 Official website of Niyodogawa 

Dissolved municipalities of Kōchi Prefecture